The 1957 Cork Senior Football Championship was the 69th staging of the Cork Senior Football Championship since its establishment by the Cork County Board in 1887.

St. Finbarr's entered the championship as the defending champions.

On 25 November 1956, St. Finbarr's won the championship following an 0–08 to 0–05 defeat of Lees in a final replay. This was their second championship title overall and their second title in succession.

Results

Finals

References

Cork Senior Football Championship